General Sani Abacha became head of state in Nigeria after a coup in November 1993 that ended the Nigerian Third Republic. He dismissed the elected civilian governors and placed a military Administrator in charge of each state. In 1996 he created a number of new states: Ebonyi, Bayelsa, Nasarawa, Zamfara, Gombe and Ekiti. Abacha died in June 1998 and was succeeded by General Abdulsalami Abubakar, who transferred or replaced most of Abacha's appointees.

Government of Nigeria
Politics of Nigeria